The Grammy Awards in the Best Contemporary (R&R) Performance categories were awarded in 1966, 1967 and 1968. They appeared in different guises at the Grammy's, aimed at male and female soloists and duos/groups. The Recording Academy used these categories to distinguish contemporary or rock 'n' roll recordings from traditional pop recordings, which had their own Best Pop Vocal Performance categories for male and female soloists and for duos or groups.

Winners and nominees

After 1968, the contemporary/rock and roll categories and the pop vocal categories merged into the Best Contemporary/Pop Vocal Performance categories. The fact that in 1968, the three winners in the Male, Female and Group categories of the Best Contemporary Performance were identical to the winners of the Best Vocal Performance categories (Bobbie Gentry, Glen Campbell and The Fifth Dimension), had shown that the distinction between the two category groups was difficult to recognise.

The Best Contemporary Single category returned in 1970 and 1971, when it was renamed Best Contemporary Song.

External links
Official site of the Grammy Awards

Contemporary RandR Solo Vocal Performance Male or Female